WEBT (91.5 FM) is a radio station licensed to serve Langdale, Alabama, United States.  The station is owned by the Langdale Educational Broadcasting Foundation. It airs a Christian radio format. The station is run by members of Emmanuel Baptist Temple of Valley, Alabama.

The station was assigned the WEBT call letters by the Federal Communications Commission on April 8, 1985.

References

External links
Emmanuel Baptist Temple

EBT
Radio stations established in 1986
Chambers County, Alabama
1986 establishments in Alabama